The Missionary Church is an evangelical Christian denomination of Anabaptist origins with Wesleyan and Pietist influences.

Faith and practice
The Missionary Church is a Trinitarian body which believes the Bible is the inspired Word of God and authoritative in all matters of faith; that "salvation is the result of genuine repentance of sin and faith in the atoning work of Christ"; and that the "church is composed of all believers in the Lord Jesus who have been vitally united by faith to Christ". They hold two Christian ordinances, baptism by immersion and the Lord's Supper, as outward signs, not a means of salvation.

History
The Missionary Church has diverse roots, especially in Anabaptism (directly through the Mennonites), German Pietism, the holiness movement, and American evangelicalism, (and to a smaller degree fundamentalism and Pentecostalism). The preamble to their Constitution references this by stating:
...the Missionary Church will be better understood by the reader who recognizes that a singular commitment of our early leaders was to the position that the Scriptures were to be the primary source of doctrine and life.  In addition to this commitment to be a biblical church, we recognize the contribution of John Wesley's emphasis on "the warmed heart"; A.B. Simpson's fourfold emphasis on Jesus Christ as Savior, Sanctifier, Healer and Coming King; the Anabaptist concepts of community and brotherhood; the evangelical emphases of the lost estate of mankind and redemption through Jesus Christ.  The Missionary Church, then, is a unique blend of the thought and life of a people who have sought to build their church according to Scriptures and who have appreciated their historical roots.

In the late 19th century, several Mennonite preachers embraced pietism and revivalism, and were excluded from their conferences. Among the leaders were Solomon Eby (1834–1929) of Ontario, William Gehman (1827–1917) of Pennsylvania, Daniel Brenneman (1834–1919) of Indiana, and Joseph E. Ramseyer (1869–1944). These brethren gradually found one another and their movements merged. Daniel Brenneman and Solomon Eby established the Reformed Mennonites in 1874. The Reformed Mennonites joined with some other expelled Mennonite members (called the New Mennonites) and formed the United Mennonites. In 1879 the followers of William Gehman (called Evangelical Mennonites) merged with the United Mennonites, creating the Evangelical United Mennonites. In 1883 a group from Ohio (called Brethren in Christ or Swankites) joined the movement. The denomination became the Mennonite Brethren in Christ on December 29, 1883, in Englewood, Ohio. The Mennonite Brethren in Christ changed their name to the United Missionary Church in 1947. 

The Missionary Church Association was founded in Berne, Indiana, in 1898. In that year, Joseph E. Ramseyer was excluded from the Égly Amish because he was rebaptized at a revival meeting. The Égly Amish rejected both the nature of the baptism (immersion) and its non-Amish and Mennonite connections (he had already been baptized by the Égly Amish). The Missionary Church Association and the United Missionary Church (formerly the Mennonite Brethren in Christ) carried on fraternal relations for many years, and then merged in 1969 to form the Missionary Church.

Branches
The Missionary Church (and the movements that formed it) has experienced three divisions — the withdrawal of several leaders from the Missionary Church Association in 1923 over disagreements concerning the Holy Spirit; in 1947 the Pennsylvania Conference of the Mennonite Brethren in Christ withdrew over issues of doctrine and polity, and in 1959 became the Bible Fellowship Church; and the Missionary Church of Canada withdrew from the Missionary Church in 1987 (and merged with the Evangelical Church of Canada in 1993 to form the Evangelical Missionary Church). The first two divisions occurred because of doctrinal differences, while the third was a friendly separation in response to legal issues pertaining to the church existing in two nations, the United States and Canada.

Status
As of 2020, in the United States there were 463 congregations.  Indiana remains the geographic center of the denomination, with nearly half of its members. Ohio and Michigan also contain sizable numbers of members.

The organization of the church is divided into 11 regions or districts (and 5 mission regions). Offices are located in Fort Wayne, Indiana. Its ministries include World Partners USA, the Missionary Church Investment Foundation, U.S. Ministries, the Pastoral leadership institute (PLI), and Bethel University. Bethel University (Indiana), located in Mishawaka, Indiana, currently has about 1,350 students.

Also, the Missionary Church Historical Society (founded in 1979) located at Bethel University was established to maintain and keep historical records. 

"The archives of the Missionary Church, as the memory center for records of historical significance, is a collection of the official papers of the denomination as well as materials relating to its origin and development. Its task is to organize and preserve these materials so they may be a valuable resource for reference and research."

In recent years, the Missionary Church has sought a closer return to its Mennonite roots.  In 2003, the Church of the United Brethren in Christ, another body with Mennonite and Pietist heritage, began pursuing an attempt to join their 200-some churches in the United States with the Missionary Church. The leadership of both denominations were firmly behind this. However, United Brethren members in the United States voted against the idea 56% to 44%, thereby halting the discussions. 

The Missionary Church is a member of the National Association of Evangelicals.

References

1883-1983:One Hundred Years of Historical Distinctives, by Dennis D. Engbrecht
Encyclopedia of American Religions, J. Gordon Melton, editor
Handbook of Denominations in the United States, by Frank S. Mead, Samuel S. Hill, and Craig D. Atwood
Marriage, Memory, and Mission: Reflections on the 25th Anniversary of the MCA/UMC Merger, by Timothy P. Erdel & Dennis D. Engbrecht
Merging and Diverging Streams: The Colorful and Complex History of the Missionary Church, by Dennis D. Engbrecht
The Missionary Church: From Radical Outcasts to the Wild Child of Anabaptism, by Timothy P. Erdel

External links
Official website
Profile of the Missionary Church on the Association of Religion Data Archives website

Christian organizations established in 1969
Anabaptist denominations
arminian denominations
Christian denominations established in the 20th century
Members of the National Association of Evangelicals
Evangelical denominations in North America